The Lower Colorado River Valley (LCRV) is the river region of the lower Colorado River of the southwestern United States in North America that rises in the Rocky Mountains and has its outlet at the Colorado River Delta in the northern Gulf of California in northwestern Mexico, between the states of Baja California and Sonora. This north–south stretch of the Colorado River forms the border between the U.S. states of California/Arizona and Nevada/Arizona, and between the Mexican states of Baja California/Sonora.

It is commonly defined as the region from below Hoover Dam and Lake Mead to its outlet at the northern Gulf of California (Sea of Cortez); it includes the Colorado River proper, canyons, the valley, mountain ranges with wilderness areas, and the floodplain and associated riparian environments. It is home to recreation activities from the river, the lakes created by dams, agriculture, and the home of various cities, communities, and towns along the river, or associated with the valley region. Five Indian reservations are located in the LCRV: the Chemehuevi, Fort Mojave and Colorado River Indian Reservations; at Yuma are the Quechan and Cocopah reservations.

Ecology

Some of the highest absolute air temperatures (of North America) are recorded in the LCRV, rivaling Death Valley; specifically Bullhead City, Lake Havasu City, Laughlin, Needles, Yuma, or the southeastern deserts of California, west of the Colorado River where extreme heat is the main summertime weather feature. Worldwide, only some deserts found in Africa and in the Middle East stand up with an even hotter summer climate on average. The LCRV is defined by three deserts. The Mojave Desert is in southeast California, southern Nevada, and northwest Arizona. South of the Mojave the Sonoran Desert spans both sides of the Colorado River. The Lower Colorado River Valley is in the western part of the Sonoran Desert, which is called the Colorado Desert. the Sonoran Desert region proper extends from areas west of the river, and then southeastwards to southeast Arizona, south along the eastern side of the Baja Peninsula cordillera to Baja California Sur, and southeast Sonora state, Mexico to the northern border of neighboring Sinaloa.

Two species, Desert Ironwood–(Olneya tesota) and the Lesser Long-nosed Bat, have geographic ranges identical to the Sonoran Desert, and are indicator species of the Sonoran Desert region. The spring flowering of ironwood, and the bat species migration arrivals also become indicators of annual or multi-year climate trends for regions of the Sonoran Desert.

Fauna

Flora
The Lower Colorado River Valley has unique plant communities because it is the most arid part of the desert and it has the highest temperatures, in excess of  during the summer. The low humidity means that most plants must have mechanisms that deal with severe water loss through evaporation. The soils tend to be typical desert soils, coarse and without well-developed organic horizons, and plants can only obtain soil water during and very soon after the infrequent rains.

Dominant plants in the valleys are low shrubs such as Ambrosia dumosa (white bursage) and  Larrea tridentata (creosote bush). Over half of the floral diversity comprises annual species, with even higher percentages in drier habitats. Vulnerable species and plant communities include saltbush/wolfberry flats, saguaro, nightblooming cereus cacti, tamarisks, barrel cactus, Sonoran panicgrass, and Acuna cactus.

Threats
The Lower Colorado River Valley subregion of the Sonoran Desert bioregion has multiple threats. Some major threats include urbanization, clearing of land for agriculture, human occupancy – especially as a result of imported external resources, and camping and camptrailers on BLM land. Other threats include harvesting for fuelwood, campfires, etc. of desert ironwood, Olneya tesota, destruction of land by offroad vehicles, especially in sand dunes, and harvesting and manipulation of groundwater.

List of major cities and communities

 Laughlin, Nevada in Clark County, Nevada
 Needles, California in San Bernardino County
 Bullhead City, Arizona
 Mojave Valley, Arizona
 Lake Havasu City, Arizona
 Silver Cliffs, Arizona/California
 Vidal, California
 Parker, Arizona
 Blythe, California
 Quartzite, Arizona
 Winterhaven, California in Imperial County, California
 Yuma, Arizona in Yuma County, Arizona
 San Luis, Arizona
 San Luis Río Colorado, Sonora

Complete list of towns, areas, etc, north to south

Nevada–California–Baja California side
 Cottonwood Cove, Nevada
 Lake Mohave
 Laughlin–Bullhead City
 Needles–Mohave Valley, AZ
 Sacramento Mountains
 Chemehuevi Mountains
 Chemehuevi Valley–(Lake Havasu City)
 Whipple Mountains
 Earp
 Big River
 Blythe–Quartzsite
 Winterhaven–Yuma
 Los Algodones, Baja California
 Colorado River Delta (at Gulf of California)

Arizona–Sonora side
 Willow Beach, Arizona
 Lake Mohave
 Bullhead City
 Mohave Valley, AZ, in Mohave County, Arizona
 Topock–Topock Marsh
 Lake Havasu City
 Bill Williams River
 Earp–Parker
 Quartzsite, in La Paz County, Arizona
 Ehrenberg
 Cibola
 Yuma in Yuma County, Arizona
 San Luis Río Colorado, Sonora
 Colorado River Delta (at Gulf of California)

Feeder-valleys, or included small valleys

Nevada–California–Baja California side
 Eldorado Valley–(endorheic)
 Piute Valley
 Laughlin–Bullhead City
 Needles–Mohave Valley, AZ
 Mohave Valley–(included)
 Sacramento Mountains
 Mohave Valley–(included)
 Chemehuevi Mountains
 Chemehuevi Valley–(Lake Havasu City)
 Whipple Mountains
 Vidal Valley
 Parker Valley–(included)
 Palo Verde Valley–(included)
 Colorado River Delta

Arizona–Sonora side
 Sacramento Valley (Arizona)–(Sacramento Wash)
 Mohave Valley–(included)
 (east of Whipple Mtns massif)–Bill Williams River–(Arizona)
 Maria fold and thrust belt Region
 Parker Valley–(included)—La Posa Plain
 Ehrenberg, Arizona
 Cibola, Arizona
 Yuma Valley–(included)-Yuma, Arizona
 Colorado River Delta

References